88Glam (stylized as 88GLAM) was a Canadian hip hop duo, formed in 2017 by Shakqueel "88Camino" Burthwright and Derek "Wise" Bissue. They were formerly signed to XO and Republic Records.

Career
Prior to the formation of 88Glam and following the disband of their former group named "Get Home Safe" with Jazz Cartier, both Derek Wise and 88Camino, who was formerly known as Drew Howard, had been releasing music separately. Wise and Camino remained in touch and collaborated frequently and previously worked together on the tracks "Anuva Wun" as a single by Camino and "I Can Tell" from Wise's 2017 debut album Inglorious. Wise and Camino began teasing their collaborative project during the summer of 2017.

The duo introduced the name "88Glam" on November 1, 2017, premiering their first music video "12" via Billboard which featured a cameo from the Weeknd. This was followed by the release of another music video for "Bali" featuring Nav and the debut of their self-titled mixtape 88Glam on November 7, 2017.

In 2018, 88Glam officially signed to XO and Republic Records. On April 20, 2018, 88Glam was re-released as 88Glam Reloaded through XO and Republic, with four new tracks including a remix with 2 Chainz.

On November 8, 2018, 88Glam released a new single titled "Lil Boat" from an upcoming album titled 88Glam2. On November 15, 2018, 88Glam2 was released under XO Records and Republic Records with features from Gunna and Nav.

88Glam is also featured on Nav's song "Rack in My Sleep" which is on the deluxe version of Bad Habits.

On March 5, 2020, 88Glam released "Swim" and revealed an upcoming album titled Close to Heaven Far from God which would be released on April 17, 2020. However, in April 2020, rumors began circulating that the duo had broken up and dropped from XO and Republic. This was followed by an announcement from 88Glam that their upcoming album Close to Heaven Far from God would be delayed. In response, 88Camino wrote on Twitter: "no 88GLAM isn't breaking up." On June 19, 2020, 88Glam announced a new mixtape titled New Mania which would be released independently on June 26, 2020. In an interview with Complex, following the release of New Mania, 88Glam confirmed their departure from XO and Republic, citing independence.

On November 6, 2020, 88Glam released a new single titled "East to West", with 6ixBuzz Entertainment through Warner Music Canada.

Discography

Studio albums

Mixtapes

Extended plays

Charted songs

Awards and nominations

References

Black Canadian musical groups
Canadian hip hop groups
Hip hop duos
Musical groups established in 2017
Musical groups from Toronto
2017 establishments in Canada